Marlborough School can refer to:
 Marlborough School (Los Angeles) in Los Angeles, California, United States
 Marlborough School (Woodstock) in Oxfordshire, England
 Marlborough School (New Zealand) in Glenfield, New Zealand
 Marlborough School (Canada) in Marlborough, Burnaby in British Columbia

See also
 The Marlborough Science Academy a secondary school in Hertfordshire, England
 Marlborough College, an independent boarding school in Marlborough, Wiltshire, England
 Marlboro College, liberal-arts college in Marlboro, Vermont, United States
 Marlborough (disambiguation)